Shorea pauciflora (called, along with some other species in the genus Shorea, dark red meranti or red lauan) is a species of plant in the family Dipterocarpaceae. It is found in Sumatra, Peninsular Malaysia and Singapore. It is threatened by habitat loss.
The specific epithet pauciflora is Latin for 'few-flowered'.

References

Sources
 

pauciflora
Trees of Sumatra
Trees of Malaya
Endangered plants
Taxonomy articles created by Polbot